Maryland is a Luxembourgish brand of cigarettes, currently owned and manufactured by "Landewyck Tobacco", In Luxemburg.

History
Maryland was introduced in 1944 when raw tobacco from Landewyck's other brand Africaine was in short supply and became a popular brand in Luxembourg, becoming known as a "cigarette for everyone".

Markets
Maryland cigarettes are mainly sold in Luxembourg, but also were or still are sold in Germany, Belgium, Spain, Switzerland, Israel, Kuwait, Uruguay, United Arab Emirates and the United States.

See also

 Tobacco smoking

References

Cigarette brands